Turan Bayramov (born 11 January 2001) is an Azerbaijani freestyle wrestler who competes at 70 kilograms, and 74 kilograms. Bayramov claimed a silver medal from the 2021 European Championships (70kg), was the 2019 U23 World Champion and the 2018 Cadet World and Youth Olympic Champion, as well as a medalist at multiple high level age-group competitions.

Wrestling career

Age-group level
As a cadet, Bayramov placed third and second at the 2017 European and World Championships respectively. The following year, he was able to claim both championships and also became the Youth Olympic Champion. As a junior, he went on to win the European Championship but placed third at the World Championships in 2019. After a second-place finish at the Senior European Championships, Bayramov claimed the Junior European Continental championship in 2021.

Senior level

2019–2020
Bayramov made his international freestyle debut aged 18 at the 2019 U23 European Championships, where he lost his first match to place 11th. Despite his placement at the European Championships, Bayramov was able to claim the U23 World Championship after four victories, becoming a three–time non–senior World and Olympic Champion. In 2020, he placed third at the prestigious Yasar Dogu International.

2021
To start off the Olympic year, Bayramov placed third at the Grand Prix de France Henri Deglane, only losing to World Championship silver medalist from the United States James Green. A month later, he placed third at the Ukrainian Memorial, notably defeating US Open champion Joseph McKenna and Junior World Champion Erik Arushanian. In April, Bayramov moved up to 70 kilograms and claimed a silver medal from the European Championships, losing to Israil Kasumov in the finale.

On August 5, Bayramov moved up to 74 kilograms and competed at the Summer Olympics, where after a win over Vasyl Mykhailov from Ukraine, he was downed by two-time World Champion Frank Chamizo Italy to place eight. He was able to compete at the 2020 Summer Olympics as Khadzhimurad Gadzhiyev was not able to compete due to injury.

2022
He won the gold medal in his event at the Matteo Pellicone Ranking Series 2022 held in Rome, Italy. He competed in the 74kg event at the 2022 World Wrestling Championships held in Belgrade, Serbia.

Freestyle record

! colspan="7"| International Senior Freestyle Matches
|-
!  Res.
!  Record
!  Opponent
!  Score
!  Date
!  Event
!  Location
|-
! style=background:white colspan=7 |
|-
|Loss
|17–6
|align=left| Frank Chamizo
|style="font-size:88%"|1–3
|style="font-size:88%" rowspan=2|August 5, 2021
|style="font-size:88%" rowspan=2|2020 Summer Olympics
|style="text-align:left;font-size:88%;" rowspan=2| Tokyo, Japan
|-
|Win
|17–5
|align=left| Vasyl Mykhailov
|style="font-size:88%"|4–2
|-
! style=background:white colspan=7 |
|-
|Loss
|16–5
|align=left| Israil Kasumov
|style="font-size:88%"|1–3
|style="font-size:88%" rowspan=4|April 19–20, 2021
|style="font-size:88%" rowspan=4|2021 European Continental Championships
|style="text-align:left;font-size:88%;" rowspan=4|
 Warsaw, Poland
|-
|Win
|16–4
|align=left| Igor Nykyforuk
|style="font-size:88%"|5–0
|-
|Win
|15–4
|align=left| Haydar Yavuz
|style="font-size:88%"|INJ (3–2)
|-
|Win
|14–4
|align=left| Nicolae Cojocaru
|style="font-size:88%"|TF 10–0
|-
! style=background:white colspan=7 |
|-
|Win
|13–4
|align=left| Erik Arushanian
|style="font-size:88%"|3–0
|style="font-size:88%" rowspan=5|February 26–28, 2021
|style="font-size:88%" rowspan=5|XXIV Outstanding Ukrainian Wrestlers and Coaches Memorial
|style="text-align:left;font-size:88%;" rowspan=5|
 Kyiv, Ukraine
|-
|Loss
|12–4
|align=left| Ernazar Akmataliev
|style="font-size:88%"|7–13
|-
|Win
|12–3
|align=left| Joseph McKenna
|style="font-size:88%"|5–1
|-
|Win
|11–3
|align=left| Andrei Bekreneu
|style="font-size:88%"|TF 11–0
|-
|Win
|10–3
|align=left| Gor Ohannesian
|style="font-size:88%"|Fall
|-
! style=background:white colspan=7 |
|-
|Win
|9–3
|align=left| Ilman Mukhtarov
|style="font-size:88%"|3–1
|style="font-size:88%" rowspan=4|February 16–17, 2021
|style="font-size:88%" rowspan=4|Grand Prix de France Henri Deglane 2021
|style="text-align:left;font-size:88%;" rowspan=4|
 Nice, France
|-
|Loss
|8–3
|align=left| James Green
|style="font-size:88%"|0–2
|-
|Win
|8–2
|align=left| Maxim Saculțan
|style="font-size:88%"|TF
|-
|Win
|7–2
|align=left| Ilman Mukhtarov
|style="font-size:88%"|5–0
|-
! style=background:white colspan=7 |
|-
|Win
|6–2
|align=left| Cengizhan Erdoğan
|style="font-size:88%"|FF
|style="font-size:88%" rowspan=3|January 10–12, 2020
|style="font-size:88%" rowspan=3|2020 Yaşar Dogu International
|style="text-align:left;font-size:88%;" rowspan=3|
 Istanbul, Turkey
|-
|Win
|5–2
|align=left| Acar Cavit
|style="font-size:88%"|TF
|-
|Loss
|4–2
|align=left| Edemi Bolkvadze
|style="font-size:88%"|Fall
|-
! style=background:white colspan=7 |
|-
|Win
|4–1
|align=left| Takuma Taniyama
|style="font-size:88%"|3–2
|style="font-size:88%" rowspan=4|October 29–30, 2019
|style="font-size:88%" rowspan=4|2019 U23 World Championships
|style="text-align:left;font-size:88%;" rowspan=4|
 Budapest, Hungary
|-
|Win
|3–1
|align=left| Ilman Mukhtarov
|style="font-size:88%"|2–1
|-
|Win
|2–1
|align=left| Maxim Saculțan
|style="font-size:88%"|3–0
|-
|Win
|1–1
|align=left| Chris McIsaac
|style="font-size:88%"|3–1
|-
! style=background:white colspan=7 |
|-
|Loss
|0–1
|align=left| Saiyn Kazyryk
|style="font-size:88%"|7–8
|style="font-size:88%"|March 4–10, 2019
|style="font-size:88%"|2019 U23 European Continental Championships
|style="text-align:left;font-size:88%;" |
 Novi Sad, Serbia
|-

References

External links
 
 
 

2001 births
Living people
Azerbaijani male sport wrestlers
Wrestlers at the 2018 Summer Youth Olympics
Youth Olympic gold medalists for Azerbaijan
European Wrestling Championships medalists
Wrestlers at the 2020 Summer Olympics
Olympic wrestlers of Azerbaijan
Islamic Solidarity Games competitors for Azerbaijan
21st-century Azerbaijani people